Águeda e Borralha is a freguesia ("civil parish") in Águeda Municipality, Aveiro District, Portugal. The population in 2011 was 13,576, in an area of 36.03 km2.

History
The freguesia was established in 2013 merging the freguesias of Águeda and Borralha.

References

2013 establishments in Portugal
Freguesias of Águeda
Populated places established in 2013